A Herdeira (English: The Gypsy Heiress) is a Portuguese telenovela broadcast and produced by TVI. It is written by Maria João Mira. The telenovela premiered on September 24, 2017  and ended on September 29, 2018. It is recorded between Portugal, Galiza and Mexico.

Plot
Luz (whose birth name is Benedita) was abandoned in a river by her stepmother when she was a baby, and was found by a couple of gypsies who adopted her. Nobody ever knew her stepmother abandoned her, not even her husband. 20 years later, she lives with her adoptive father in Mexico and doesn't know she was adopted, while her real father tries everything to find her; He will go to Mexico after receiving information about a woman who can help him finding Luz, and will even meet her several times in Mexico and in Portugal as well, without even knowing that she's his daughter. Luz's return to Portugal will cause a sequel of twists and turns and many conflicts with those who are against her as well.

Seasons

Cast

References

External links

2017 telenovelas
Portuguese telenovelas
Televisão Independente telenovelas
2017 Portuguese television series debuts
2018 Portuguese television series endings
Portuguese-language telenovelas